The 56th Infantry Division (56-ya Pekhotnaya Diviziya) was an infantry formation of the Russian Imperial Army.

Organization
1st Brigade
221st Roslav Infantry Regiment
222nd Krasnan Infantry Regiment
2nd Brigade
223rd Odoev Infantry Regiment
224th Yukhnov Infantry Regiment
56th Artillery Brigade

References

Infantry divisions of the Russian Empire